This is a list of flag bearers who have represented Nicaragua at the Olympics.

Flag bearers carry the national flag of their country at the opening ceremony of the Olympic Games.

See also
Nicaragua at the Olympics

References

Nicaragua at the Olympics
Nicaragua
Olympic flagbearers